World's Most Wanted may refer to:
"World's Most Wanted" (The Invincible Iron Man), a comic book arc of The Invincible Iron Man
World's Most Wanted (TV series), a 2020 English-language French docuseries
Lupin III: World's Most Wanted, the American version of the manga Lupin the 3rd Part II

See also
Most Wanted (disambiguation)